Hawthorn East is a suburb of Melbourne, Victoria, Australia,  east of the Melbourne central business district, located within the City of Boroondara local government area. Hawthorn East recorded a population of 14,834 at the 2021 census.

The suburb is roughly bounded by Barkers Road to the north, Burke Road to the east, Toorak Road and the Monash Freeway to the south and Auburn Road to the west.

Hawthorn East is the home of a number of head offices for some of Australia's largest companies, including Coles and Bunnings.

History
The formally recognised traditional owners for the area in which Balwyn is located are the Wurundjeri People, who lived on the land for at least 14,000 years. The Wurundjeri People are represented by the Wurundjeri Woi Wurrung Cultural Heritage Aboriginal Corporation.

The current suburb of Hawthorn East was established in the 1800s and many of the historical buildings and houses are still well-preserved. It is located in the local government area of the City of Boroondara and is between two shopping strips, located on Glenferrie Road and Burke Road.

Population
In the 2016 Census, there were 14,321 people in Hawthorn East. 63.8% of people were born in Australia. The next most common countries of birth were China 5.2%, India 3.5%, England 3.1%, New Zealand 1.8% and Malaysia 1.6%. 70.0% of people spoke only English at home. Other languages spoken at home included Mandarin 6.5%, Greek 2.2%, Cantonese 1.6%, Italian 1.2% and Hindi 1.2%. The most common responses for religion were No Religion 40.0% and Catholic 19.4%.

Places of interest

Fritsch Holzer Park is a large open space, popular for recreational activities and named after Augustus Fritsch and the Holzer brothers, who formed the Upper Hawthorn Brick Company on this site in 1883. The former Hawthorn Council purchased the site in 1972 and used it as a landfill site until 1986, then a temporary waste transfer station until 1989. In 1995 a project was launched to reconstruct this area into a park. Anderson Park is another significant park in the area and offers panoramic views of the Melbourne CBD. Other parks of note include Cato Park (part of the original property of Frederick Cato) and Victoria Road Reserve.

The head office of Coles (one of Australia's biggest companies & second largest supermarket) is located in Hawthorn East, adjacent to Toorak Rd. The Coles Myer group which was acquired by Western Australia conglomerate Wesfarmers in 2007 (site opened in 1987) was the original purpose for the site, which was the former Toorak Drive-In Theatre.

Education

Primary and secondary schools within Hawthorn East include Alia College, Auburn Primary School, Auburn South Primary School, Bialik College and Auburn High School (formerly Hawthorn Secondary College). Auburn Primary School was established in 1889.

Public transport
Hawthorn East is served by the following routes:

Tram routes
70:  Waterfront City to Wattle Park
72: Camberwell to Melbourne University
75: Victoria Harbour to Vermont South

Train routes
Hawthorn East is serviced by Auburn railway station. Two nearby stations in bordering suburbs include Camberwell and Glenferrie. These stations are situated on the following lines: The Belgrave, Lilydale and Alamein lines. The Glen Waverley line runs past the southern boundary of the suburb and the closest station is: Tooronga

See also
 City of Hawthorn – Hawthorn East was previously within this former local government area.

References

Suburbs of Melbourne
Suburbs of the City of Boroondara